Rzhevka is a rural locality (a selo) and the administrative center of Rzhevskoye Rural Settlement, Rovensky District, Belgorod Oblast, Russia. The population was 589 as of 2010. There are 6 streets.

Geography 
Rzhevka is located 23 km northeast of Rovenki (the district's administrative centre) by road. Nagorye is the nearest rural locality.

References 

Rural localities in Rovensky District, Belgorod Oblast